Walter Godfrey Whittingham (5 October 1861 – 17 June 1941) was a Church of England bishop.

Education
Whittingham was educated at the City of London School and Peterhouse, Cambridge.

Career
Ordained in 1886, he began his career with curacies at St Margaret's Church, Leicester and St Thomas the Apostle's, South Wigston. After this he held incumbencies at Weedon, Buckinghamshire, Knighton, Leicestershire and Glaston, Rutland. He was Archdeacon of Oakham from 1918 to 1923 when he was ordained to the episcopate as the third Bishop of St Edmundsbury and Ipswich, a post he held for 17 years. He was consecrated bishop at Westminster Abbey on 1 November 1923, by Randall Davidson, Archbishop of Canterbury;

Death
Whittingham died on 17 June 1941.

Notes

 

1861 births
People educated at the City of London School
Alumni of Peterhouse, Cambridge
Archdeacons of Oakham
20th-century Church of England bishops
Bishops of St Edmundsbury and Ipswich
1941 deaths